× Maclellanara, abbreviated Mclna. in the horticultural trade, is the nothogenus comprising intergeneric hybrids between the orchid genera Brassia, Odontoglossum and Oncidium (Brs. x Odm. x Onc.).

References

Orchid nothogenera
Oncidiinae
Historically recognized angiosperm taxa